Dania (Dana) Odelshevna Agisheva is a  Russian actress.

Early life and education
Born in family of playwright, professor of VGIK's Odelsha Agishev. She graduated from the Romano-German Department of the faculty of Philology of MSU.

Awards
Agisheva won awards at Kinoshock and Pacific Meridian film festivals, and was nominated for the Golden Eagle Award in 2012.

Filmography
2002: Three Against All  as Tanya (TV series)
2003: Angel on the Road  as episode (TV series)
2004: Remote Access as Zhenya
 2004: Young and Happy as Inga
2005: Garpastum as Nina
2006: Worm as Jungia
2006: Ostrog. Case Fyodor Sechenov as Christina
2007: The Best Time of the Year as Valentina (first age)
 2008: Dark Planet as Speaker-informant
 2009: Reflections  as Julia (TV series)
 2009:  as Anna Akhmatova in 1910 / Anna Kaminskaya
2010: The Reverse Movement as episode
2010:  Prison Break as Nadezhda (TV series)
2011: Object 11 as Elena Nechaeva (TV series)
 2011: Elena  as episode
2012: Alien Face as Virginia 
 2013: Everything Will Be Fine as Nadya
 2014: Beach as Angela (TV series)
 2017:  as Nadya Kostrova (TV series)
 2018: White Crows as Anya (post-production)

References

External links
 
 Dana Agisheva at the KinoPoisk.ru 
 Dana Agisheva at the kino-teatr.ru  

1980 births
Actors from Tashkent
Living people
Russian film actresses
Russian television actresses
21st-century Russian actresses
Moscow State University alumni